Damti Station is a station of the Daegu Metro Line 2 in Manchon-dong, Suseong District, Daegu, South Korea. It is named after Damtigogae mountain pass and is also called Suseong College and Daeryun High School Station.

See also 
 Damtigogae
 Suseong College
 Daeryun High School

External links 
  Cyber station information from Daegu Metropolitan Transit Corporation

Daegu Metro stations
Suseong District
Railway stations opened in 2005